Elaeocarpus culminicola, commonly known as Michael's quandong, is a species of flowering plant in the family Elaeocarpaceae and is native to parts of Malesia and Australasia. It is a tree with wavy leaves with wavy or toothed edges, racemes of white, cream-coloured or pink flowers and more or less spherical fruit.

Description
The leaves have wavy or toothed edges and are arranged spirally around, and crowded towards the end of the branches. The fragrance from the flowers is strong but not particularly pleasant. The are about twenty-five to forty stamens. Flowering occurs in late winter and is normally profuse.

Taxonomy
Elaeocarpus culminicola was first formally described in 1892 by Otto Warburg in Botanische Jahrbücher für Systematik, Pflanzengeschichte und Pflanzengeographie from specimens collected in the Finisterre Range in 1888. The specific epithet (culminicola) means "peak dweller".

Range and habitat
Michael's quandong is native to the Philippines, Sulawesi, Maluku Islands, New Guinea, Bismarck Archipelago, the Northern Territory and Queensland, where it is an understorey tree in well developed rainforest. It is often associated with wet or swampy conditions.

Ecology
The fruits of E. culminicola are eaten by cassowaries.

Uses
The timber is a commercial hardwood.

Gallery

References

culminicola
Flora of Queensland
Flora of the Northern Territory
Flora of New Guinea
Plants described in 1892